Creature Unknown is a 2004 American horror film directed by Michael Burnett and starring Chase Masterson.

Cast
Chase Masterson as Kat
Maggie Grace as Amanda
Cory Hardrict as Lance
Betty Okino as Coral
John Keyser as Sean
Chris Hoffman as Steve
Matt Hoffman as Wes
Kristen Herold as Ally
Ella Bowman as Rachel

References

External links
 
 

American horror films
2004 horror films
2004 films
2000s English-language films
2000s American films